The one hundred thirty-fifth Connecticut House of Representatives district elects one member of the Connecticut House of Representatives. Its current representative is Anne Hughes. Before 2002, the district contained the towns of Easton, Redding and parts of Newtown and Weston; boundary changes which took effect for the 2002 election removed Newtown and part of Redding from the district and added the remaining portion of Weston. 
The 135th District was a safe Republican seat in the House, in part due to the lack of Democratic opposition, but an increased Democratic Party presence in recent years has changed this.

List of representatives

Recent elections

References

Election Results and Related Data. Secretary of the State of Connecticut. Last modified 4/25/2016. Retrieved from https://web.archive.org/web/20101110081436/http://www.sots.ct.gov/sots/cwp/view.asp?a=3179&Q=392194&SOTSNav_GID=1846 on 5/19/2016.

External links 
 Google Maps - Connecticut House Districts

135